Nicholas Donnell Graham (born January 19, 1984) is a former American football cornerback and current Cornerbacks coach at University of Texas–San Antonio. He was signed by the Philadelphia Eagles as an undrafted free agent in 2007 and has also been a member of the Indianapolis Colts and the Saskatchewan Roughriders of the Canadian Football League. He played college football at Tulsa. He signed with the Ti-Cats on August 28

College career
Graham played in 12 games as a true freshmen. As a sophomore, he started five of the 12 games he played in while recording 40 tackles.

As a junior, he recorded 72 tackles and six interceptions. In his senior season, he recorded 53 tackles and one interception. During overtime against Navy, he made a game-winning block on an extra point attempt.

At Tulsa, Graham appeared in 50 games (30 starts) while logging 180 tackles and seven interceptions. He was a two-time second-team All-Conference USA selection.

Professional career

Philadelphia Eagles
Graham was signed by the Philadelphia Eagles as an undrafted free agent following the 2007 NFL Draft. He was inactive for the team's regular season opener and made his NFL debut against the Washington Redskins on September 17. He went on to play in 15 games for the Eagles as a rookie, recording 11 tackles.

Graham was waived by the Eagles on August 30, 2008 during final cuts.

Indianapolis Colts
Graham was signed by the Indianapolis Colts on October 8, 2008 after the team released running back Justin Forsett and offensive tackle Corey Hilliard. He was released on October 14. The Colts re-signed him on October 22 after releasing cornerback Keiwan Ratliff. Graham was placed on season-ending injured reserve on November 18, 2008.

After being re-signed and competing for a backup cornerback job with the Colts during the 2009 off-season Graham was waived/injured during final cuts on September 5, 2009. Graham reached an injury settlement with the Colts on September 12, 2009.

References

External links

Just Sports Stats
Indianapolis Colts bio
Philadelphia Eagles bio
Tulsa Golden Hurricane bio

1984 births
Living people
Sportspeople from Oklahoma City
Players of American football from Oklahoma
Coaches of American football from Oklahoma
American football cornerbacks
Tulsa Golden Hurricane football players
Philadelphia Eagles players
Indianapolis Colts players
Canadian football defensive backs
Saskatchewan Roughriders players
Hamilton Tiger-Cats players
Tulsa Golden Hurricane football coaches
Central Oklahoma Bronchos football coaches
McNeese Cowboys football coaches
UTSA Roadrunners football coaches